Medzany is a village and municipality in Prešov District in the Prešov Region of eastern Slovakia. It has a 14th-century Catholic Church All Saints Church, Medzany

History
In historical records the village was first mentioned in 1248.

Geography

References

External links
 
 
https://web.archive.org/web/20071027094149/http://www.statistics.sk/mosmis/eng/run.html

Villages and municipalities in Prešov District
Šariš